Tom Minty (born 3 October 1985) is a professional cricketer who plays for Jersey. In 2014 he played in the 2014 ICC World Cricket League Division Four and he was selected in the Jersey squad for the 2015 ICC World Twenty20 Qualifier tournament.

References

External links
 

1985 births
Living people
Jersey cricketers
Place of birth missing (living people)